Roy Elwood Clausen (August 21, 1891, Randall, Iowa – August 21, 1956, Berkeley, California) was a biochemist, botanist, plant geneticist, and drosophilist.

Biography
Clausen was the eldest of six siblings. As a boy with his family, he moved from Iowa to Newkirk, Oklahoma in 1900. In 1910 he graduated with a bachelor of science degree in agriculture from Stillwater's Oklahoma A&M (later renamed Oklahoma State University). In 1910 Roy and his brother Curtis both matriculated at the University of California, Berkeley. There Roy Clausen graduated in 1912 with a second bachelor's degree in agriculture with a major in plant pathology and graduated in 1914 with a Ph.D. in biochemistry with a minor in plant pathology. His thesis advisor was T. Brailsford Robertson. From 1914 until his death in 1956, Roy Clausen was a faculty member at UC Berkeley. During World War I he was on an eighteen-month leave of absence when he served in the U.S. Army as a supply officer in a depot brigade. During World War II he was on another leave of absence when he served in 1944 and 1945 as a personnel officer at the Los Alamos Laboratory.

As a graduate assistant of William A. Setchell, Clausen began investigating the genus Nicotiana and continued this research until he died in 1956. Early in his career he studied the genetics of Drosophila but eventually he concentrated on the genetics of Nicotiana and gave his Drosophila stocks to the geneticist Walter Poppino Spencer (1898–1969). For about 20 years, up to 1926, Clausen collaborated with T. H. Goodspeed. From an analysis of chromosome pairing in hybrids of Nicotania species, Clausen and Goodspeed were the first to provide empirical evidence for Winge's hypothesis of plant hybridization following chromosome doubling. After 1934 Clausen collaborated extensively with Donald Ross Cameron (1907–1984).

With Ernest B. Babcock he wrote Genetics in Relation to Agriculture (1918) with a second edition in 1927. After his return from Los Alamos, he served as the chair of UC Berkeley's department of genetics.

Clausen was elected a member of the National Academy of Sciences in 1951. He was the president of the Genetics Society of America in 1953.

He married Mae Winifred Falls in 1916. He died from a heart attack in 1956, and his widow died in 1959.

Selected publications

References

External links
 

1891 births
1956 deaths
20th-century American botanists
American geneticists
Oklahoma State University alumni
University of California, Berkeley alumni
University of California, Berkeley faculty
Members of the United States National Academy of Sciences